USS LSM-355 was a  in the United States Navy during World War II. The ship was transferred to France as L9011, South Vietnam as RVNS Hát Giang (HQ-400) and Philippines as RPS Western Samar (LP-66).

Construction and career 
LSM-355 was laid down on 11 November 1944 at Brown Shipbuilding Co., Houston, Texas, was launched on 2 December 1944 and commissioned on 24 December 1944.

During World War II, LSM-355 was assigned to the Asiatic-Pacific theater. She was assigned to occupation service in the Far East from 2 September to 23 December 1945. 

LSM-355 was decommissioned on 23 October 1946, but was recommissioned on 18 September 1950 amid the Korean War. During the war, it supplied air force detachments in Korea and Japan. As such it was awarded battle stars for U.N. Summer-Fall Offensive 1952 (1 to 31 October 1952) and Korean Defense Summer-Fall 1952 (12 to 20 November 1952). 

She was put out of service on 11 January 1954 at the Pacific Reserve Fleet and loaned to the French on 22 January 1954.

She was struck from the Navy Register.

The ship was commissioned into the French Navy on 28 June 1954 and renamed L9011. She later took part in the Indo-China War, chartering anti-Communist refugees.

L9011 was then transferred to South Vietnam in December 1955 becoming the RVNS Hát Giang with the pennant number HQ-400, remaining in service during the Vietnam War. In 1966, Hát Giang was converted to a hospital ship. The ship's armament was retained, and additional deckhouses built on Hát Giangs well deck.

During the fall of Vietnam, she escaped to the Philippines on 30 April 1975. The ship was commissioned into the Philippine Navy on 17 November 1975 as RPS Western Samar (LP-66). She was also briefly used as a Floating Medical Facility.

She was put out of service between 1985 and 1989 and sold to a private company to be used as a barge. Her fate is unknown.

Awards 
LST-355 have earned the following awards:

American Campaign Medal
Asiatic-Pacific Campaign Medal
World War II Victory Medal 
Navy Occupation Service Medal (with Asia clasp) 
National Defense Service Medal 
Korean Service Medal (2 battle stars)  
United Nations Service Medal  
Republic of Korea War Service Medal

Citations

Sources 
 
 
 
 
 
 
 

World War II amphibious warfare vessels of the United States
Ships built in Houston
1944 ships
LSM-1-class landing ships medium
Ships transferred from the United States Navy to the French Navy
Ships transferred from the United States Navy to the Republic of Vietnam Navy
Ships transferred from the United States Navy to the Philippine Navy